Valentina Kibalnikova (Uzbek: Валентина Кибальникова; born 16 October 1990) is an Uzbekistani athlete competing in the sprint hurdles. She represented her country at the 2016 Summer Olympics without advancing from the first round.

Her personal bests are 13.00 seconds in the 100 metres hurdles (-0.2 m/s, Almaty 2016) and 8.32 seconds in the 60 metres hurdles (Doha 2016). The first is the current national records.

International competitions

References

1990 births
Living people
Uzbekistani female hurdlers
Athletes (track and field) at the 2014 Asian Games
Athletes (track and field) at the 2016 Summer Olympics
Olympic athletes of Uzbekistan
Asian Games competitors for Uzbekistan
21st-century Uzbekistani women